Statistics of DPR Korea Football League in the 2007 season.

Overview
The 2007 edition of the Technical Innovation Contest was played with teams in two groups, with the first and second-place finishers in each group advancing to an elimination stage. In the semi-finals, P'yŏngyang City defeated Kigwanch'a 2–1, and Amrokkang defeated Kyŏnggong'ŏp. In the final, P'yŏngyang City defeated Amrokkang 2–0, and Kyŏnggong'ŏp defeated Kigwanch'a 3–1 in the third place match.

References

DPR Korea Football League seasons
1
Korea
Korea